Kyrgyzstan competed at the 2012 Winter Youth Olympics in Innsbruck, Austria. The Kyrgyzstani team was made up of one male athlete, a cross country skier.

Cross country skiing

Kyrgyzstan qualified one boy in cross-country skiing.

Boy

Sprint

See also
Kyrgyzstan at the 2012 Summer Olympics

References

Nations at the 2012 Winter Youth Olympics
Kyrgyzstan at the Youth Olympics
2012 in Kyrgyzstani sport